The Volcano Ranch experiment was an array of particle detectors in Volcano Ranch, New Mexico, used to measure ultra-high-energy cosmic rays. The array was built by John Linsley and Livio Scarsi in 1959. On February 22, 1962, Linsley observed an air shower at Volcano Ranch created by a primary particle with an energy greater than 1020 eV, the highest energy cosmic ray particle ever detected at the time.  Linsley continued to operate Volcano Ranch until 1978, when it was closed due to lack of funding.

References

Cosmic-ray experiments